The H. E. Bailey Turnpike is an  toll road in the southwestern region of the U.S. state of Oklahoma. The route, opened on April 23, 1964, is a four-lane limited access highway that connects Oklahoma City to Lawton in its northern section and Lawton to Wichita Falls along its southern section, roughly paralleling U.S. Route 277. The turnpike also includes an  spur route that leads toward Norman, Oklahoma. Since 1982, it has been signed as a part of Interstate 44, and as such uses its mileposts. Travel along the full length of the toll road costs $5.50 for a two-axle vehicle.

Route description
The H. E. Bailey Turnpike takes a generally south to north route from Wichita Falls to Lawton before turning northeast toward Oklahoma City. US 277 and US 281 leave I-44 at US 70, and together run parallel to the Turnpike. The turnpike runs north-northeast for 15 miles, intersecting SH 5 along with US 277 and US 281. A toll plaza is located underneath the SH 5 overpass; loop ramps feed all entering and exiting traffic into the toll plaza. Just north of SH 5, a Service Area is located in the median of the turnpike, featuring food, fuel, and restroom amenities, as well as an Oklahoma Welcome Center. The turnpike then continues north for ten more miles until it again reaches US 277 and US 281, also intersecting SH 36. The turnpike temporarily ends at this interchange, and the two US Routes join a free ODOT-maintained I-44 through Lawton.

After leaving the Lawton/Fort Sill area, US Highway 62, having joined the I-44 freeway in Lawton, along with US 277 and US 281, once again leave I-44 at an interchange north of Lawton, marking the south end of the northern  section of the turnpike. The turnpike proceeds northeast, coming to an Interchange with US 277 at Elgin. A toll plaza is located near Mile 66. This plaza replaced an older facility just south of Chickasha in 2017. The turnpike continues toward Chickasha, intersecting US 81 and US 277 at the first interchange. A second interchange again junctions US 277, along with US 62 and SH 9. North of Chickasha, a Service Area is located in the median, which provides food, fuel, and restroom services. The turnpike goes north through northern Grady County, coming to a second toll plaza at Mile 97. The turnpike then has a cloverleaf interchange with the Norman Spur and SH 4. The turnpike continues northeast for ten more miles before ending at the interchange of US-62 and US 277 north of Newcastle where the three routes continue to Oklahoma City as an urban freeway.

Aside from the mainline, the turnpike also consists of a  extension southwest of Newcastle also referred to as the H. E. Bailey Norman Spur. It connects I-44 and SH 4 to SH 9 and provides a shorter route to Norman when traveling from Lawton. The spur proceeds east from the mainline turnpike, and almost immediately comes to a toll plaza. Two miles east, the turnpike intersects SH 76. The Norman Spur ends at the interchange with US 62, US 277, and SH 9. Traffic coming off the spur continues straight, and is joined by SH 9 which continues the rest of the way to Norman as a divided highway.

History
Ideas for connecting Lawton and Oklahoma City started in 1953. The state highways between Oklahoma City and Lawton, were dangerously narrow, which included many 'cramped, death-trap' bridges. The route was not part of any federal interstate highway system plans, so only a turnpike was feasible. Oklahoma Senate Bill 454, which amended House Bill 933 that authorized creation of the Will Rogers Turnpike, allowed creation of a southwest turnpike and a proposed turnpike connecting Oklahoma City toward Wichita, Kansas, which was later constructed by the Oklahoma Department of Transportation and became Interstate 35.

Both HB 933 and SB 454 were submitted as State Question 359 and 360 and passed on January 26, 1954. In July 1960, an economic feasibility study was completed for the H.E. Bailey Turnpike and in November 1961, $56 million in bonds were issued for the turnpike's construction. The north section of the H. E. Bailey from southwest Oklahoma City to north Lawton was completed on March 1, 1964. The south section from south Lawton to the Texas border was completed on April 23, 1964.

In 1982, as part of Oklahoma's 75th statehood "Diamond Jubilee" celebrations, I-44 was signed through Oklahoma City to the Red River encompassing the turnpike. On October 19, 2001, the H. E. Bailey Norman Spur connecting I-44 to State Highway 9 was opened.

The route's namesake, H. E. Bailey, served as the city manager of Oklahoma City from 1941 to 1944, and later as the director of the Oklahoma Department of Transportation.

Originally, the portion of the turnpike south of Lawton was designed to parkway-like standards, with a slightly mounded grassy median and no left shoulders. It has since been completely upgraded to a cable barrier bordered by left shoulders.

In 2021, the Norman Spur became part of SH-4.

The turnpike was converted to cashless tolling via PlatePay and PikePass in Summer 2022. This was done to remove the need for toll plazas, which were seen as inefficient and prone to traffic accidents. The project, along with a project to rehabilitate the pavement between Lawton to the Oklahoma City metropolitan area, is being done in order to raise the speed limit from 75 mph to 80 mph.

Tolls
A two-axle vehicle currently pays $6.25 ($4.50 with Pikepass) to drive the full length of the Turnpike and an additional 70¢ (60¢ with Pikepass) to drive the Norman Spur. PikePass customers get free toll on the Norman Spur if they also pass through the Newcastle Mainline Toll Plaza on the same trip. Lesser tolls are also charged at some entrance ramps where shunpiking would otherwise be possible.

Full toll plazas on the H.E. Bailey Turnpike are located near the intersection with the H.E. Bailey Norman Spur, southwest of Chickasha, and under the overpass at SH-5 (Walters exit). Unattended ramp toll plazas are located at US-62 (Chickasha/Anadarko exit - eastbound exit and westbound entrance only), US-277 (Elgin/Fletcher exit - eastbound exit and westbound entrance only) on the I-44 portion of the turnpike and at SH-76 (Blanchard/Tuttle exit - westbound exit and eastbound entrance only) on the Norman Spur.

On June 21, 2022, the H.E. Bailey Turnpike from Oklahoma City to Lawton and its spur to Norman was converted to cashless tolling. The stretch from Lawton to the Texas state line converted to cashless tolling on July 27, 2022.

Services
Law enforcement along the H. E. Bailey Turnpike is provided by Oklahoma Highway Patrol Troop YC, a special troop assigned to the turnpike.

The turnpike has two service areas with both located in the median of the highway. The Walters Service Area is located north of exit number 20. The Chickasha Service Area is located north of exit number 83. Both service areas offer food, gas, and a convenience store.

Exit list

Mainline

Southern Segment

H. E. Bailey Norman Spur
Note: Mile numbers on the Norman Spur are posted 100 more than the mile they represent. For example, Mile 4 is posted as Mile 104.

See also
 Oklahoma Turnpike Authority
 Pikepass

References

External links

Oklahoma Turnpike Authority

Toll roads in Oklahoma
Tolled sections of Interstate Highways
Interstate 44
Transport infrastructure completed in 1964
Transportation in Cotton County, Oklahoma
Transportation in Comanche County, Oklahoma
Transportation in Grady County, Oklahoma
Transportation in McClain County, Oklahoma
1964 establishments in Oklahoma